Quiliano is a comune (municipality) in the Province of Savona in the Italian region Liguria, located about  southwest of Genoa and about  west of Savona.

The municipality of Quiliano contains these frazioni (subdivisions, mainly villages and hamlets) : Cadibona, astride the watershed between the Alps and Apennines,  Valleggia, Montagna, Roviasca, Faia and Tiassano.

In the environs of Quiliano remain several Roman archaeological sites: a Roman bridge still functions in the valley of Quazzola and remains of a Roman villa may be seen at San Pietro in Carpignano.

Quiliano borders the following municipalities: Altare, Mallare, Orco Feglino, Savona, Vado Ligure, and Vezzi Portio.

Demographic evolution

Twin towns — sister cities
Quiliano is twinned with:

  Municipality of Ajdovščina, Slovenia (1972)
  Great Wyrley, United Kingdom (2000)
  Mâcon, France (2009)

References

Cities and towns in Liguria